al-Malik, literally "the King", is a name that may refer to:

The title King of Kings
One of the 99 names of God in Islam
Imam Malik
Abd al-Malik ibn Marwan, Umayyad caliph
Al-Malik al-Rahim, Buyid rulers
Al-Malik al-Aziz, Buyid prince
Al-Kamil, sultan of Egypt

See also
Malik

de:Al-Malik